Serhiy Pichuhin (born 13 March 1961) is a Ukrainian Olympics sailor that represented the Unified Team in the 1992 Summer Olympics and Ukraine in the 1996 and 2000 Summer Olympics.

References

Ukrainian male sailors (sport)
Olympic sailors of the Unified Team
Soviet male sailors (sport)
Olympic sailors of Ukraine
Sailors at the 1992 Summer Olympics – Soling
Sailors at the 1996 Summer Olympics – Soling
Sailors at the 2000 Summer Olympics – Soling
European Champions Soling
Soling class world champions